The Royal Geelong Yacht Club is a yacht club founded in 1859 and based in Geelong, Victoria, Australia. The club received its royal patronage in 1924.

The club is based on the shores of Corio Bay in central Geelong. The 223-berth Bay City Marina was built in the 1980s in front of the clubhouse, and forms part of the Waterfront Geelong precinct.

The Yacht Club is famous for hosting the Festival of Sails, the highly popular keelboat regatta in Australia, which attracts the best sailing crew. It was hosted for the first time by the Yacht Club in 1925 and by 1986 witnessed participation of 361 yachts.

References

External links
Official Site

Royal yacht clubs
Sport in Geelong
Sports teams in Victoria (Australia)
Yacht clubs in Victoria (Australia)
Geelong Yacht Club, Royal
1859 establishments in Australia
Sports clubs established in 1859
Organisations based in Geelong